Camilla Cattaneo (born 12 February 1990) is an Italian former synchronised swimmer. She competed in the team event at the 2016 Summer Olympics. Cattaneo is an athlete of the Gruppo Sportivo Fiamme Oro.

References

External links
 

1990 births
Living people
Italian synchronized swimmers
Olympic synchronized swimmers of Italy
Synchronized swimmers at the 2016 Summer Olympics
People from Savona
Artistic swimmers of Fiamme Oro
Sportspeople from the Province of Savona